Forest Waldemar "Seluya" McNeir (August 16, 1875 – May 9, 1957) was an American sport shooter who competed in the 1920 Summer Olympics. He was born in Washington, D.C. and died in Houston, Texas.

In 1920, McNeir won the gold medal as member of the American team in the team clay pigeons competition.

References

External links
Forest McNeir at Olympic Database
Forest McNeir at US Trapshooting Hall of Fame

1875 births
1957 deaths
American male sport shooters
Shooters at the 1920 Summer Olympics
Olympic gold medalists for the United States in shooting
Trap and double trap shooters
Olympic medalists in shooting
Medalists at the 1920 Summer Olympics